The 2020–21 season was Ludogorets Razgrad's tenth consecutive season in the Bulgarian First League, of which they were defending champions.

Season events
On 21 July, midfielder Serkan Yusein joined CSKA 1948 on loan for the season.

On 23 July, Ludogorets announced the signing of Alex Santana from Botafogo, with Rafael Forster heading in the opposite direction.

On 24 July, Beroe Stara Zagora announced the signing of Dimo Bakalov from Ludogorets.

On 30 July, Bernard Tekpetey joined Ludogorets on loan from Schalke 04 for two seasons.

On 12 August, Ludogorets announced the signing of Higinio Marín from Numancia.

On 16 August, Ludogorets announced the signing of Elvis Manu from Beijing Renhe.

At the draw for the Third qualifying round of the 2020–21 UEFA Europa League, Ludogorets were given a bye to the Play-off Round after a draw of lots between the teams dropping into the Europa League after elimination in the 2020–21 UEFA Champions League.

On 4 September, Olivier Verdon joined Ludogorets on loan for the season from Alavés.

On 2 October, Ludogorets announced the signing of Josué Sá from Anderlecht.

On 5 October, Kiril Despodov joined on loan from Cagliari for the duration of the season.

On 26 October, manager Pavel Vrba resigned from his position, with Stanislav Genchev being appointed as interim-manager in his place.

On 12 November, Jorginho was loaned to Wadi Degla until July 2021, with an option to make the move permanent.

On 3 January, Valdas Dambrauskas was announced as Ludogorets Razgrad's new Head Coach.

On 2 February, Júnior Brandão joined Rio Ave on loan until the end of the season.

On 5 February, Ludogorets Razgrad announced the signing of Pieros Sotiriou from Astana.

On 1 March, Ludogorets Razgrad announced the signing of Kristijan Kahlina on loan from HNK Gorica.

Squad

Out on loan

Transfers

In

Loans in

Out

Loans out

Released

Friendlies

Competitions

Bulgarian Supercup

A Football Group

Regular stage

Table

Results summary

Results by round

Results

Championship stage

Table

Results summary

Results by round

Results

Bulgarian Cup

UEFA Champions League

Qualifying rounds

UEFA Europa League

Qualifying rounds

Group stage

Squad Statistics

Appearances and goals

|-
|colspan="16"|Players away from the club on loan:

|-
|colspan="16"|Players who appeared for Ludogorets Razgrad that left during the season:

|}

Goal scorers

Clean sheets

Disciplinary Record

References

Ludogorets Razgrad
PFC Ludogorets Razgrad seasons
Ludogorets Razgrad
Bulgarian football championship-winning seasons